This a list of opera singers from Russian Federation, Soviet Union and Russian Empire including both ethnic Russians and people of other ethnicities. This list includes those, who were born in the Russian Federation/Soviet Union/Russian Empire but later emigrated, and those, who were born elsewhere but immigrated to the country and performed there for a long time.

Opera came to Russia in the 18th century. At first there were mostly Italian language operas presented by Italian opera troupes. Later some foreign composers serving to the Russian Imperial Court began to write Russian-language operas, while some Russian composers were involved into writing of the operas in Italian and French. Only at the beginning of the 1770s the first modest attempts of the composers of Russian origin to compose operas to the Russian librettos were made. The 19th century was the golden age of Russian opera, with such prominent composers as Mikhail Glinka, Alexander Dargomyzhsky, Modest Mussorgsky, Pyotr Tchaikovsky, Alexander Borodin and Nikolai Rimsky-Korsakov. Their traditions were carried on to the 20th century by Igor Stravinsky, Sergei Rachmaninoff, Sergei Prokofiev and Dmitri Shostakovich. Bolshoi and Mariinsky theatres continue to be the main opera and ballet scenes of Russia and one of the most prominent in the world.

A number of Russian opera singers rose to fame already in the 18th century, but it was the late 19th and the 20th centuries that saw the appearance of many world-renown, well-remembered and still popular soloists, including Leonid Sobinov, Galina Vishnevskaya and, of course, Feodor Chaliapin, the greatest bass of all time. Contemporary Russia is represented at the world scene with such singers as Dmitri Hvorostovsky, Anna Netrebko and Alexander Anisimov.

Alphabetical list

A

B

C

D

F

G

H

K

L

M

N

O

P

R

S

V

Y

Z

 
Opera singers
Russian opera singers
Opera Singers, Russian
Opera Singers, Russian